Simidele Adeife Omonla Adeagbo,  (born July 29, 1981 in Toronto, Ontario, Canada) is a Nigerian skeleton racer who competed at the 2018 Winter Olympics. She is Nigeria and Africa’s first female skeleton athlete. She was the first black female Olympian in the sport.  In 2022, she won the woman's mono bob event in the 2022 EuroCup, held in Germany. In so doing, she became the first athlete from Africa to win an international sled race.  Before competing in skeleton, Adeagbo competed in triple jump, last competing in 2008.

Early life
Adeagbo was born in Toronto, in Ontario, Canada, to Nigerian parents. She moved to Ibadan, Nigeria when she was an infant, and lived there for six years before moving to the United States.

Career
Adeagbo served as a Nike body double for Serena Williams. Adeagbo is a marketing manager for Nike in South Africa since 2012.

On August 18, 2018, Adeagbo spoke alongside other noteworthy speakers, to a sold-out audience during the TEDxLagos spotlight event at the Muson Centre. She shared the stage with legal practitioner Supo Shasore, Award-winning technologist Ade Olufeko, Art curator Tokini Peterside and media personality Banky W. amongst others.

Sports career
Adeagbo started Track and Field competition in highschool. She retired from Track and Field competition in June 2008. At that time, she failed to qualify for the Olympics by 8-inches. She had become a 4-time NCAA All-American, and was the triple jump record holder for the University of Kentucky.

Adeagbo became interested in skeleton in December 2016, when she heard about the Nigeria bobsled team attempting to qualify for the Olympics. She first tried to qualify for that team at tryouts in July 2017, where she had to try in a skeleton sled instead of a bobsled. She started skeleton in September 2017. She became sponsored by her employer, Nike, for skeleton.

Adeagbo competed at her first Olympics at the 2018 Winter Olympics in skeleton, as part of the Nigerian team, becoming the first Nigerian to compete at the Winter Olympics. She was the Nigerian flagbearer at the 2018 Winter Olympics closing ceremony.

Personal bests

Track and field

Skeleton

References

External links

 
 
 Nigerian Bobsled and Skeleton Federation: https://bsfnigeria.com

Skeleton racers at the 2018 Winter Olympics
Olympic skeleton racers of Nigeria
Nigerian female skeleton racers
Nigerian female triple jumpers
Canadian sportspeople of Nigerian descent
American sportspeople of Nigerian descent
American female triple jumpers
University of Kentucky alumni
Kentucky Wildcats women's track and field athletes
1981 births
Living people
Sportspeople from Ibadan